In the x86 architecture, an input/output base address is the first I/O address of a range of consecutive read/write addresses that a device uses on the x86's I/O bus. This base address is sometimes called an I/O port.

Common I/O base address device assignments in IBM PC compatible computers

This table represents the common I/O address ranges for device assignments in IBM PC compatible computers. The base address is the first in each range. Different types of devices can vary in the number of I/O ports they need for communication with the CPU, therefore the extent of the address range varies. Also, address decoders often do not decode all address bits, causing the necessary I/O address range window to be larger than necessary or mirrored to other addresses as well.
Each row of the table represents a device or chip within the computer system. For example, the address of the status port in a parallel printer adapter is at 0x0001. Depending on the adapter's configuration, this may be mapped in at different locations within the PC's I/O address range. Assuming, the adapter would present a third parallel port (with base address 0x0278), this would result in the status port mapped in at 0x0279 in the CPU'S I/O address space.

When there are two or more identical devices in a computer system, each device would be mapped to a different base address (e.g. LPT2 and LPT3 for printers).

Note:  For many devices listed above the assignments can be changed via jumpers, DIP switches, or Plug-And-Play software.

See also
 IRQ - interrupt request

References
 HelpPC Quick Reference Utility by David Jurgens

External links
 Ralf Brown's Interrupt List – includes a list of I/O ports on IBM PC compatibles
 Base address term definition from Webopedia 
 Introduction to IRQs, DMAs and Base Addresses Copyright © 1999, Eugene Blanchard, Published in Issue 38 of Linux Gazette, March 1999
 The PC Guide
 Apogee FAQ at RinkWorks
 Programming the AdLib/Sound Blaster FM Music Chips
 Perangkat Input dan Output Komputer at OS/2 Site tehdian

X86 architecture
IBM PC compatibles